Unbinilium, also known as eka-radium or simply element 120, is the hypothetical chemical element in the periodic table with symbol Ubn and atomic number 120. Unbinilium and Ubn are the temporary systematic IUPAC name and symbol, which are used until the element is discovered, confirmed, and a permanent name is decided upon. In the periodic table of the elements, it is expected to be an s-block element, an alkaline earth metal, and the second element in the eighth period. It has attracted attention because of some predictions that it may be in the island of stability.

Unbinilium has not yet been synthesized, despite multiple attempts from German and Russian teams. Another attempt by the Russian team is planned, but the precise timeframe has not been publicly released. Experimental evidence from these attempts shows that the period 8 elements would likely be far more difficult to synthesise than the previous known elements.

Unbinilium's position as the seventh alkaline earth metal suggests that it would have similar properties to its lighter congeners; however, relativistic effects may cause some of its properties to differ from those expected from a straight application of periodic trends. For example, unbinilium is expected to be less reactive than barium and radium and be closer in behavior to strontium, and while it should show the characteristic +2 oxidation state of the alkaline earth metals, it is also predicted to show the +4 and +6 oxidation states, which are unknown in any other alkaline earth metal.

Introduction

History
Elements 114 to 118 (flerovium through oganesson) were discovered in "hot fusion" reactions bombarding the actinides plutonium through californium with calcium-48, a quasi-stable neutron-rich isotope which could be used as a projectile to produce more neutron-rich isotopes of superheavy elements. This cannot easily be continued to elements 119 and 120, because it would require a target of the next actinides einsteinium and fermium. Tens of milligrams of these would be needed to create such targets, but only micrograms of einsteinium and picograms of fermium have so far been produced. More practical production of further superheavy elements would require projectiles heavier than 48Ca, but this is expected to be more difficult. Attempts to synthesize elements 119 and 120 push the limits of current technology, due to the decreasing cross sections of the production reactions and their probably short half-lives, expected to be on the order of microseconds.

Synthesis attempts

Past
Following their success in obtaining oganesson by the reaction between 249Cf and 48Ca in 2006, the team at the Joint Institute for Nuclear Research (JINR) in Dubna started  experiments in March–April 2007 to attempt to create unbinilium with a 58Fe beam and a 244Pu target. The attempt was unsuccessful, and the Russian team planned to upgrade their facilities before attempting the reaction again.

 +  → * → no atoms

In April 2007, the team at the GSI Helmholtz Centre for Heavy Ion Research in Darmstadt, Germany attempted to create unbinilium using a 238U target and a 64Ni beam:

 +  → * → no atoms

No atoms were detected. The GSI repeated the experiment with higher sensitivity in three separate runs in April–May 2007, January–March 2008, and September–October 2008, all with negative results, reaching a cross section limit of 90 fb.

In 2011, after upgrading their equipment to allow the use of more radioactive targets, scientists at the GSI attempted the rather asymmetrical fusion reaction:

 +  → * → no atoms

It was expected that the change in reaction would quintuple the probability of synthesizing unbinilium, as the yield of such reactions is strongly dependent on their asymmetry. Although this reaction is less asymmetric than the 249Cf+50Ti reaction, it also creates more neutron-rich unbinilium isotopes that should receive increased stability from their proximity to the shell closure at N = 184. Three signals were observed in May 2011; a possible assignment to 299Ubn and its daughters was considered, but could not be confirmed, and a different analysis suggested that what was observed was simply a random sequence of events.

In August–October 2011, a different team at the GSI using the TASCA facility tried a new, even more asymmetrical reaction:
 +  → * → no atoms

Because of its asymmetry, the reaction between 249Cf and 50Ti was predicted to be the most favorable practical reaction for synthesizing unbinilium, though it produces a less neutron-rich isotope of unbinilium than any other reaction studied. No unbinilium atoms were identified.

This reaction was investigated again in April to September 2012 at the GSI. This experiment used a 249Bk target and a 50Ti beam to produce element 119, but since 249Bk decays to 249Cf with a half-life of about 327 days, both elements 119 and 120 could be searched for simultaneously:
 +  → * → no atoms
 +  → * → no atoms
Neither element 119 nor element 120 was observed.

Planned
In May 2021, the JINR announced plans to investigate the 249Cf+50Ti reaction in their new facility. The 249Cf target would be produced by the Oak Ridge National Laboratory in Oak Ridge, Tennessee, United States; the 50Ti beam would be produced by the Hubert Curien Pluridisciplinary Institute in Strasbourg, Alsace, France. If diplomatic relations between Russia and the United States make this impossible, then the 248Cm+54Cr reaction may be investigated instead, with a Russian-produced 248Cm target and a French-produced 54Cr beam, though the cross section would likely be three to ten times lower.

In March 2022, Yuri Oganessian gave a seminar at the JINR considering how one could synthesise element 120 in the 248Cm+54Cr reaction.

Naming
Mendeleev's nomenclature for unnamed and undiscovered elements would call unbinilium eka-radium. The 1979 IUPAC recommendations temporarily call it unbinilium (symbol Ubn) until it is discovered, the discovery is confirmed and a permanent name chosen. Although the IUPAC systematic names are widely used in the chemical community on all levels, from chemistry classrooms to advanced textbooks, scientists who work theoretically or experimentally on superheavy elements typically call it "element 120", with the symbol E120, (120) or 120.

Predicted properties

Nuclear stability and isotopes

The stability of nuclei decreases greatly with the increase in atomic number after curium, element 96, whose half-life is four orders of magnitude longer than that of any currently known higher-numbered element. All isotopes with an atomic number above 101 undergo radioactive decay with half-lives of less than 30 hours. No elements with atomic numbers above 82 (after lead) have stable isotopes. Nevertheless, because of reasons not yet well understood, there is a slight increase of nuclear stability around atomic numbers 110–114, which leads to the appearance of what is known in nuclear physics as the "island of stability". This concept, proposed by University of California professor Glenn Seaborg, explains why superheavy elements last longer than predicted.

Isotopes of unbinilium are predicted to have alpha decay half-lives of the order of microseconds. In a quantum tunneling model with mass estimates from a macroscopic-microscopic model, the alpha-decay half-lives of several unbinilium isotopes (292–304Ubn) have been predicted to be around 1–20 microseconds. Some heavier isotopes may be more stable; Fricke and Waber predicted 320Ubn to be the most stable unbinilium isotope in 1971. Since unbinilium is expected to decay via a cascade of alpha decays leading to spontaneous fission around copernicium, the total half-lives of unbinilium isotopes are also predicted to be measured in microseconds. This has consequences for the synthesis of unbinilium, as isotopes with half-lives below one microsecond would decay before reaching the detector. Nevertheless, new theoretical models show that the expected gap in energy between the proton orbitals 2f7/2 (filled at element 114) and 2f5/2 (filled at element 120) is smaller than expected, so that element 114 no longer appears to be a stable spherical closed nuclear shell, and this energy gap may increase the stability of elements 119 and 120. The next doubly magic nucleus is now expected to be around the spherical 306Ubb (element 122), but the expected low half-life and low production cross section of this nuclide makes its synthesis challenging.

Given that element 120 fills the 2f5/2 proton orbital, much attention has been given to the compound nucleus 302Ubn* and its properties. Several experiments have been performed between 2000 and 2008 at the Flerov Laboratory of Nuclear Reactions in Dubna studying the fission characteristics of the compound nucleus 302Ubn*. Two nuclear reactions have been used, namely 244Pu+58Fe and 238U+64Ni. The results have revealed how nuclei such as this fission predominantly by expelling closed shell nuclei such as 132Sn (Z = 50, N = 82). It was also found that the yield for the fusion-fission pathway was similar between 48Ca and 58Fe projectiles, suggesting a possible future use of 58Fe projectiles in superheavy element formation.

In 2008, the team at GANIL, France, described the results from a new technique which attempts to measure the fission half-life of a compound nucleus at high excitation energy, since the yields are significantly higher than from neutron evaporation channels. It is also a useful method for probing the effects of shell closures on the survivability of compound nuclei in the super-heavy region, which can indicate the exact position of the next proton shell (Z = 114, 120, 124, or 126). The team studied the nuclear fusion reaction between uranium ions and a target of natural nickel:

 +  → * → fission

The results indicated that nuclei of unbinilium were produced at high (~70 MeV) excitation energy which underwent fission with measurable half-lives just over 10−18 s. Although very short (indeed insufficient for the element to be considered by IUPAC to exist, because a compound nucleus has no internal structure and its nucleons have not been arranged into shells until it has survived for 10−14 s, when it forms an electronic cloud), the ability to measure such a process indicates a strong shell effect at Z = 120. At lower excitation energy (see neutron evaporation), the effect of the shell will be enhanced and ground-state nuclei can be expected to have relatively long half-lives. This result could partially explain the relatively long half-life of 294Og measured in experiments at Dubna. Similar experiments have indicated a similar phenomenon at element 124 but not for flerovium, suggesting that the next proton shell does in fact lie beyond element 120. In September 2007, the team at RIKEN began a program utilizing 248Cm targets and have indicated future experiments to probe the possibility of 120 being the next proton magic number (and 184 being the next neutron magic number) using the aforementioned nuclear reactions to form 302Ubn*, as well as 248Cm+54Cr. They also planned to further chart the region by investigating the nearby compound nuclei 296Og*, 298Og*, 306Ubb*, and 308Ubb*.

Atomic and physical
Being the second period 8 element, unbinilium is predicted to be an alkaline earth metal, below beryllium, magnesium, calcium, strontium, barium, and radium. Each of these elements has two valence electrons in the outermost s-orbital (valence electron configuration ns2), which is easily lost in chemical reactions to form the +2 oxidation state: thus the alkaline earth metals are rather reactive elements, with the exception of beryllium due to its small size. Unbinilium is predicted to continue the trend and have a valence electron configuration of 8s2. It is therefore expected to behave much like its lighter congeners; however, it is also predicted to differ from the lighter alkaline earth metals in some properties.

The main reason for the predicted differences between unbinilium and the other alkaline earth metals is the spin–orbit (SO) interaction—the mutual interaction between the electrons' motion and spin. The SO interaction is especially strong for the superheavy elements because their electrons move faster—at velocities comparable to the speed of light—than those in lighter atoms. In unbinilium atoms, it lowers the 7p and 8s electron energy levels, stabilizing the corresponding electrons, but two of the 7p electron energy levels are more stabilized than the other four. The effect is called subshell splitting, as it splits the 7p subshell into more-stabilized and the less-stabilized parts. Computational chemists understand the split as a change of the second (azimuthal) quantum number l from 1 to 1/2 and 3/2 for the more-stabilized and less-stabilized parts of the 7p subshell, respectively. Thus, the outer 8s electrons of unbinilium are stabilized and become harder to remove than expected, while the 7p3/2 electrons are correspondingly destabilized, perhaps allowing them to participate in chemical reactions. This stabilization of the outermost s-orbital (already significant in radium) is the key factor affecting unbinilium's chemistry, and causes all the trends for atomic and molecular properties of alkaline earth metals to reverse direction after barium.

Due to the stabilization of its outer 8s electrons, unbinilium's first ionization energy—the energy required to remove an electron from a neutral atom—is predicted to be 6.0 eV, comparable to that of calcium. The electron of the hydrogen-like unbinilium atom—oxidized so it has only one electron, Ubn119+—is predicted to move so quickly that its mass is 2.05 times that of a non-moving electron, a feature coming from the relativistic effects. For comparison, the figure for hydrogen-like radium is 1.30 and the figure for hydrogen-like barium is 1.095. According to simple extrapolations of relativity laws, that indirectly indicates the contraction of the atomic radius to around 200 pm, very close to that of strontium (215 pm); the ionic radius of the Ubn2+ ion is also correspondingly lowered to 160 pm. The trend in electron affinity is also expected to reverse direction similarly at radium and unbinilium.

Unbinilium should be a solid at room temperature, with melting point 680 °C: this continues the downward trend down the group, being lower than the value 700 °C for radium. The boiling point of unbinilium is expected to be around 1700 °C, which is lower than that of all the previous elements in the group (in particular, radium boils at 1737 °C), following the downward periodic trend. The density of unbinilium has been predicted to be 7 g/cm3, continuing the trend of increasing density down the group: the value for radium is 5.5 g/cm3.

Chemical

The chemistry of unbinilium is predicted to be similar to that of the alkaline earth metals, but it would probably behave more like calcium or strontium than barium or radium. Like strontium, unbinilium should react vigorously with air to form an oxide (UbnO) and with water to form the hydroxide (Ubn(OH)2), which would be a strong base, and releasing hydrogen gas. It should also react with the halogens to form salts such as UbnCl2. While these reactions would be expected from periodic trends, their lowered intensity is somewhat unusual, as ignoring relativistic effects, periodic trends would predict unbinilium to be even more reactive than barium or radium. This lowered reactivity is due to the relativistic stabilization of unbinilium's valence electron, increasing unbinilium's first ionization energy and decreasing the metallic and ionic radii; this effect is already seen for radium. the chemistry of unbinilium in the +2 oxidation state should be more similar to the chemistry of strontium than to that of radium. On the other hand, the ionic radius of the Ubn2+ ion is predicted to be larger than that of Sr2+, because the 7p orbitals are destabilized and are thus larger than the p-orbitals of the lower shells.

Unbinilium may also show the +4 oxidation state, which is not seen in any other alkaline earth metal, in addition to the +2 oxidation state that is characteristic of the other alkaline earth metals and is also the main oxidation state of all the known alkaline earth metals: this is because of the destabilization and expansion of the 7p3/2 spinor, causing its outermost electrons to have a lower ionization energy than what would otherwise be expected. The +6 state involving all the 7p3/2 electrons has been suggested in a hexafluoride, UbnF6. The +1 state may also be isolable. Many unbinilium compounds are expected to have a large covalent character, due to the involvement of the 7p3/2 electrons in the bonding: this effect is also seen to a lesser extent in radium, which shows some 6s and 6p3/2 contribution to the bonding in radium fluoride (RaF2) and astatide (RaAt2), resulting in these compounds having more covalent character. The standard reduction potential of the Ubn2+/Ubn couple is predicted to be −2.9 V, which is almost exactly the same as that for the Sr2+/Sr couple of strontium (−2.899 V).

In the gas phase, the alkaline earth metals do not usually form covalently bonded diatomic molecules like the alkali metals do, since such molecules would have the same number of electrons in the bonding and antibonding orbitals and would have very low dissociation energies. Thus, the M–M bonding in these molecules is predominantly through van der Waals forces. The metal–metal bond lengths in these M2 molecules increase down the group from Ca2 to Ubn2. On the other hand, their metal–metal bond-dissociation energies generally increase from Ca2 to Ba2 and then drop to Ubn2, which should be the most weakly bound of all the group 2 homodiatomic molecules. The cause of this trend is the increasing participation of the p3/2 and d electrons as well as the relativistically contracted s orbital. From these M2 dissociation energies, the enthalpy of sublimation (ΔHsub) of unbinilium is predicted to be 150 kJ/mol.

The Ubn–Au bond should be the weakest of all bonds between gold and an alkaline earth metal, but should still be stable. This gives extrapolated medium-sized adsorption enthalpies (−ΔHads) of 172 kJ/mol on gold (the radium value should be 237 kJ/mol) and 50 kJ/mol on silver, the smallest of all the alkaline earth metals, that demonstrate that it would be feasible to study the chromatographic adsorption of unbinilium onto surfaces made of noble metals. The ΔHsub and −ΔHads values are correlated for the alkaline earth metals.

See also
 Island of stability: flerovium–unbinilium–unbihexium

Notes

References

Bibliography
 
 
 
 
 

Unbinilium
Alkaline earth metals
120